= Dékon =

Neighborhood of Lomé, Togo

Coordinates: 6°8′10″N 1°13′44″E

Dékon is a neighborhood of Lomé, Togo. Although it's one of the business areas of the city (containing many Internet cafés), it is also one of the poorest areas, in which child prostitution is common.
